Zabierzewo  is a village in the administrative district of Gmina Przybiernów, within Goleniów County, West Pomeranian Voivodeship, in north-western Poland.

The village has a population of 150.

References

Zabierzewo